Kfar Masaryk (lit. Masaryk Village) is a kibbutz in northern Israel. Located in Western Galilee near the Belus River and south of Acre, it falls under the jurisdiction of Mateh Asher Regional Council.

History

The founders were Jewish immigrants from Czechoslovakia and Lithuania, who settled in Petah Tikva in 1932. The following year they formed Kibbutz Czecho-Lita and moved to Bat Galim in Haifa. In 1934, they moved to an area of sand dunes near Kiryat Haim and changed the name of the group to "Mishmar Zevulun" (Guard of the Zevulun). In 1937 they were joined by a group of Polish Jewish immigrants who were members of Hayotzer.

Despite opposition from the Jewish Agency, who reasoned that the sandy soil could not support agriculture, Mishmar Zevulun was established on 29 November 1938 as the 29th tower and stockade settlement. In 1940 the kibbutz moved to its present site and was renamed Kfar Masaryk after Tomáš Garrigue Masaryk, the first President of Czechoslovakia.

Economy
The kibbutz grows cotton, tomatoes and avocados; breeds cattle, poultry and carp; and operates paper and cardboard box factories. It also manufactures electronic devices.

See also
Czech Republic-Israel relations

References

External links
Kibbutz website
Kibbutz Kfar Masaryk Collection on the Digital collections of Younes and Soraya Nazarian Library, University of Haifa

Czech-Jewish culture in Israel
Lithuanian-Jewish culture in Israel
Slovak-Jewish culture in Israel
Kibbutzim
Kibbutz Movement
Populated places established in 1938
Populated places in Northern District (Israel)
1938 establishments in Mandatory Palestine